The Human Proteome Folding Project (HPF) is a collaborative effort between New York University (Bonneau Lab), the Institute for Systems Biology (ISB) and the University of Washington (Baker Lab), using the Rosetta software developed by the Rosetta Commons.

HPF Phase 1 applied Rosetta v4.2x software on the human genome and 89 others, starting in November 2004. Phase 1 ended in July 2006. HPF Phase 2 (HPF2) applies the Rosetta v4.8x software in higher resolution, "full atom refinement" mode, concentrating on cancer biomarkers (proteins found at dramatically increased levels in cancer tissues), human secreted proteins and malaria.

Phase 1 ran on two volunteer computing grids: on United Devices' grid.org, and on the World Community Grid, an IBM philanthropic initiative. Phase 2 of the project ran exclusively on the World Community Grid; it terminated in 2013 after more than 9 years of IBM involvement.

The Institute for Systems Biology will use the results of the computations within its larger research efforts.

Publications

See also
 BOINC
 Folding@home
 Foldit
 Human proteome project
 List of volunteer computing projects

References

External links
HPF page at WCG
HPF updates by Dr. Bonneau

Berkeley Open Infrastructure for Network Computing projects
Proteomics
Protein structure
Volunteer computing projects